Discodoris is a genus of sea slugs, dorid nudibranchs, shell-less marine gastropod molluscs in the family Discodorididae.

Species 

Species in the genus Discodoris include:
 Discodoris achroma Valdés, 2001
 Discodoris aurila Marcus & Marcus, 1967
 Discodoris boholiensis Bergh, 1877
 Discodoris branneri MacFarland, 1909
 Discodoris cebuensis Bergh, 1877
 Discodoris coerulescens Bergh, 1888
 Discodoris concinna Alder & Hancock, 1864 (nomen dubium)
 Discodoris edwardsi Vayssière, 1902 (taxon inquirendum)
 Discodoris erubescens Bergh, 1884
 Discodoris ghanensis Edmunds, 2011
 Discodoris glabella (Bergh, 1907)
 Discodoris hummelincki (Ev. Marcus & Er. Marcus, 1963): represented as Tayuva lilacina (Gould, 1852) (alternate representation)
 Discodoris labifera (Abraham, 1877) 
 Discodoris laminea (Risbec, 1928)
 Discodoris natalensis (Krauss, 1848)
 Discodoris patriziae Perrone, 1991 : nomen dubium
 Discodoris perplexa (Bergh, 1907)
 Discodoris pliconoto Moro & Ortea, 2015
 Discodoris pseudida (Bergh, 1907)
 Discodoris purcina Ev. Marcus & Er. Marcus, 1967
 Discodoris rosi Ortea, 1979
 Discodoris rubens Vayssière, 1919
 Discodoris sauvagei (Rochebrune, 1881)
 Discodoris schmeltziana Bergh, 1880  (nomen dubium)
 Discodoris sordii Perrone, 1990 : nomen dubium
 Discodoris stellifera Ihering in Vayssière, 1904
 Discodoris tristis Bergh, 1899
 Discodoris turia Burn, 1969
 Discodoris voniheringi MacFarland, 1909 (nomen dubium)
Species brought into synonymy
 Discodoris atromaculata (Bergh, 1880): synonym of Peltodoris atromaculata Bergh, 1880
 Discodoris cavernae (Starmühlner, 1955): synonym of Paradoris indecora (Bergh, 1881)
 Discodoris confusa Ballesteros, Llera & Ortea, 1985: synonym of Tayuva lilacina (Gould, 1852)
 Discodoris crawfordi Burn, 1969: synonym of Rostanga crawfordi (Burn, 1969)
 Discodoris dubia Bergh, 1904: synonym of Paradoris dubia (Bergh, 1904)
 Discodoris egena Bergh, 1904: synonym of Paradoris dubia (Bergh, 1904)
 Discodoris erythraeensis Vayssière, 1912: synonym of Paradoris erythraeensis (Vayssière, 1912)
 Discodoris evelinae Marcus, 1955: synonym of Montereina branneri (MacFarland, 1909)
 Discodoris fragilis Alder & Hancock, 1864: synonym of Sebadoris fragilis (Alder & Hancock, 1864)
 Discodoris fulva O'Donoghue, 1924: synonym of Geitodoris heathi (MacFarland, 1905)
 Discodoris golaia Marcus & Marcus, 1966: synonym of Montereina golaia (Marcus & Marcus, 1966)
 Discodoris heathi MacFarland, 1905: synonym of Geitodoris heathi (MacFarland, 1905)
 Discodoris hedgpethi Marcus & Marcus, 1960: synonym of Montereina branneri (MacFarland, 1909): synonym of Discodoris branneri MacFarland, 1909
 Discodoris indecora Bergh, 1881: synonym of Paradoris indecora (Bergh, 1881)
 Discodoris ketos Ev. & Er. Marcus, 1967: synonym of Tayuva lilacina (Gould, 1852)
 Discodoris lilacina Gould, 1852: synonym of Tayuva lilacina (Gould, 1852)
 Discodoris liturata Bergh, 1905: synonym of Paradoris liturata (Bergh, 1905)
 Discodoris lora Marcus, 1965: synonym of Paradoris lora (Marcus, 1965)
 Discodoris lutescens Bergh, 1905: synonym of Rostanga lutescens (Bergh, 1905)
 Discodoris maculosa Bergh, 1884: synonym of Tayuva lilacina (Gould, 1852)
 Discodoris mauritiana Bergh, 1889: synonym of Peltodoris mauritiana Bergh, 1889, in turn synonym of Peltodoris murrea (Abraham, 1877)
 Discodoris mavis Marcus & Marcus, 1967: synonym of Geitodoris mavis (Marcus & Marcus, 1967)
 Discodoris meta Bergh, 1877: synonym of Discodoris boholiensis Bergh, 1877
 Discodoris millegrana Alder & Hancock, 1854: synonym of Aporodoris millegrana (Alder & Hancock, 1854)
 Discodoris modesta Bergh, 1877: synonym of Montereina modesta (Bergh, 1877)
 Discodoris morphaea Bergh, 1877: synonym of Sebadoris fragilis (Alder & Hancock, 1864)
 Discodoris mortenseni Ev. Marcus & Er. Marcus, 1963 is a synonym of Jorunna spazzola (Marcus, 1955)
 Discodoris notiperda Risbec, 1956: synonym of Sebadoris fragilis (Alder & Hancock, 1864)
 Discodoris opisthidia Bergh, 1877: synonym of Montereina opisthidia (Bergh, 1877)
 Discodoris pallida Baba, 1937: synonym of Montereina pallida (Baba, 1937)
 Discodoris palma Allan, 1933: synonym of Tayuva lilacina (Gould, 1852)
 Discodoris pardalis (Alder & Hancock, 1864): synonym of Montereina pardalis (Alder & Hancock, 1864)
 Discodoris paroa Burn, 1969: synonym of Montereina paroa (Burn, 1969)
 Discodoris phoca Ev. Marcus & Er. Marcus, 1967: synonym of Montereina phoca (Ev. Marcus & Er. Marcus, 1967)
 Discodoris planata is a synonym of Geitodoris planata
 Discodoris porri Vérany, 1846 : synonym of Paradoris indecora (Bergh, 1881)
 Discodoris punctifera Abraham, 1877: synonym of Montereina punctifera (Abraham, 1877)
 Discodoris pusae Marcus Er., 1955: synonym of Geitodoris pusae (Er. Marcus, 1955)
 Discodoris sandiegensis (J. G. Cooper, 1863): synonym of Diaulula sandiegensis (J. G. Cooper, 1863)
 Discodoris schmeltziana Bergh, 1880: synonym of Discodoris schmeltziana (Bergh, 1875)
 Discodoris tema Edmunds, 1968: synonym of Geitodoris tema (Edmunds, 1968)
 Discodoris vanikoro Pruvot-Fol, 1934: synonym of Sebadoris fragilis (Alder & Hancock, 1864)
 Discodoris wetleyi Allan, 1932: synonym of Jorunna funebris (Kelaart, 1859)
Nomine dubia
 Discodoris crucis (Ørsted in Mörch, 1863)
 Discodoris muta Bergh, 1877
 Discodoris notha Bergh, 1877

References

Discodorididae